Civilization is the twelfth full-length studio album by Vancouver industrial band Front Line Assembly, released on January 20, 2004 through Metropolis. The album was produced by band founder Bill Leeb and returning member Rhys Fulber, who had departed in 1996. Civilization has been described by reviewers as being a more stylistically diverse and relaxed album compared to the band's previous releases.

Release

Copy protection
Promotional copies of the album came with copy protection. Metropolis called it "an experimental run" and emphasized that the sales copies were delivered as regular CDs without protection.

Album errors
Metropolis mislabeled the back cover track listing of Civilization on at least three separate occasions. The errors included swapped song titles, missing the song "Parasite" and excluding the "Dissident" page in the booklet. These numerous errors led to rumors that Metropolis was releasing special edition copies of the album, all of which were false. While the track listing found on the back cover was incorrect, the liner notes still presented all the songs in the correct order, excluding copies with the missing "Dissident" page.

Singles
Civilization was accompanied by two singles. "Maniacal" was released about three months before the album. It contains the original version and a remix of the title track as well as the B-side "Anti". The follow-up to the album was the single "Vanished". It includes two remixes of the title track and the non-album tracks "Stürm", "Disseminate" and "Uncivilized". "Stürm" is also featured on the soundtrack album from horror film Saw. Both singles reached the top of the Deutsche Alternative Charts single chart (see Chart positions).

Track listing

Personnel

Front Line Assembly
 Bill Leeb – production, vocals
 Rhys Fulber – production, programming

Additional musicians
 Jamie Muhoberac – vocals (6), keyboard (6, 9)
 Leah Randi – vocals (1, 3, 4), bass (6)
 Sean Ashby – electric guitar (4)
 Christian Olde Wolbers – electric guitar (6)

Chart positions

Album

Singles

"Maniacal"

"Vanished"

References 

2004 albums
Front Line Assembly albums
Metropolis Records albums
Albums produced by Rhys Fulber